Gilsenan is a surname which may originate with followers of Senán mac Geirrcinn. Notable people with the surname include:

Matthew Gilsenan (born 1971), Irish singer 
Alan Gilsenan (born 1962), Irish writer, filmmaker, and theater director
Conor Gilsenan (born 1992), Irish rugby union player
Matt Gilsenan (1915–2013), Irish Gaelic footballer